This article aims at keeping an up-to-date list of Coronavirus strains and subspecies successfully isolated and cultured in laboratory, a task which is often challenging. When relevant it shall include a few synthetic chimera as well as some strains that were only propagated in laboratory animals.

Alphacoronavirus

 229E 
 NL63 
 PEDV (adding Trypsin to Vero cells), propagated in piglets, repeated passage in Vero cells, using Vero/TMPRSS2 and Vero/MSPL cells 
 SADS

Tegacovirus
 TGEV  PRCV 
 Feline coronavirus
 Canine coronavirus.
 A recent recombinant CCoV-HuPn-2018  including a human case

Betacoronavirus

Merbecovirus

 HKU5 SARS-S chimera 
 HKU5 and a MERS PDF-2180-S chimera, with trypsin 
 Various MERS HKU4-RBD chimera 
 HKU4 
 MERS

Embecovirus

 Bovine coronavirus 
 Rabbit HKU14 
 MHV
 OC43 (1967)
 HKU1 
 Parker rat coronavirus 
 Dromedary camel HKU23 
 Canine respiratory coronavirus (CRCoV) 
 Equine coronavirus

Sarbecovirus

 SARS 
 HKU3 SARS-RBD synthetic recombinant 
 bat-SL-CoV ZC45 (in suckling rats) 
 WIV1 
 RsSHC014 (synthetic clone) 
 WIV16 
 WIV1 Rs4874-S synthetic chimera 
 Rs4874 and two synthetic chimera WIV1 Rs7237-S and WIV1 Rs4231-S 
 SARS-CoV-2 
 BANAL-236 
 Pangolin Guangxi P2V 
 Rco319, Rc-os20, Rc-mk2, Rc-kw8 (in Vero with Rc-ACE2)
 WIV1 Rs4081-S synthetic chimera (with trypsin). In the spike it is a member of clade 2 (including HKU3). 
 WIV1 RsSHC014-S1 chimera 
 Two clade 1 viruses (using ACE2) RsYN2012 and RsYN2016 and one clade 2 virus (not using ACE2) RsHuB2019 in Huh7 cells with trypsin.

Gammacoronavirus

 Avian coronavirus (IBV) 
 Turkey coronavirus

Deltacoronavirus

 Porcine deltacoronavirus HKU15 including a human case 
 Parrot coronavirus

References

Animal virology